Heřmaň is a municipality and village in České Budějovice District in the South Bohemian Region of the Czech Republic. It has about 200 inhabitants.

History
The first written mention of Lhota, a farmyard which was the predecessor of Heřmaň, is from 1400. The village of Heřmaň was established on its site in 1787.

References

External links

Cities and towns in the Czech Republic
Populated places in České Budějovice District